The Khalsa Fauj (lit. "army of the pure") were the military forces of the Khalsa order of the Sikhs, established by the tenth guru, Guru Gobind Singh, in 1699. It replaced the Akal Sena that had been established by the sixth guru, Guru Hargobind.

History

Origin 

Guru Gobind Singh succeeded his father, Guru Tegh Bahadur, as guru in 1675. He felt that the Akal Sena was not living up to the challenge and sought to reform the Sikh military forces. Therefore, it was replaced by the Khalsa Fauj after the formalization of the Khalsa order into the sanctified framework of Sikhism at Anandpur on 13 April 1699. Guru Gobind Singh had an ultimate vision of Sikh sovereignty.
The precedence and authority for establishing the Khalsa Fauj was traced back to the teachings of Guru Nanak. It was committed to freeing the Punjab of foreign domination. The army followed the principle of violence only when all other means to address an issue have been exhausted, a principle of dharamyudh (rightous warfare).

Guru Gobind Singh 

The Khalsa Fauj frequently warred with the Mughal empire and Rajas belonging to various Hill States of the Shivalik Hills. The army had to relocate from Anandpur in 1704. A short-lived reconciliation between the Mughals and Sikhs occurred in 1707, when Gobind Singh and his Khalsa Fauj spent around 10 months encamped alongside the imperial Mughal army of Bahadur Shah whilst the latter was campaigning in Rajasthan. However, Gobind Singh felt that the Mughal emperor was avoiding having discussions with him on the issue of Punjab and therefore he sent Banda Singh Bahadur to the northwest to place pressure on the Mughals.

Banda Singh Bahadur 

Banda Singh Bahadur had been given the mantle of leadership by the Guru himself when he was blessed with five arrows from the Guru's own quiver as a symbol of victory. The Guru saw potential in Banda as a warrior against tyranny and injustice, therefore he prepared him for future missions and assigned a group of Panj Piare (five beloved ones), consisting of Binod Singh, Kahan Singh, Baj Singh, Daya Singh, and Ram Singh, to assist the newly converted Sikh in his affairs, alongside 20 other Sikh warriors. Banda Singh was promoted to jathedar of the panth (general of the Khalsa Fauj) on 5 October 1708 by the Guru. Banda and his retinue were instructed to go to Sirhind to take revenge for the tyranny of the local Mughal governor of the area. After the passing of Guru Gobind Singh at Nanded in the Deccan (located modern-day Maharashtra), Banda Singh Bahadur became the caretaker of the Khalsa Fauj. He would go on to rebel against the Mughal empire and form the first sovereign Sikh republican state, ruling over parts of the Punjab, especially in the southeastern regions, albeit the polity was a short-lived one. Most of the recruits into the Khalsa Fauj during the years of Banda's reign drew from the Jat peasantry. The headquarters at this time was Sadhaura. Banda and 2,000 of his followers were captured and publicly executed in 1716 by the Mughals.

Post-Banda 
After the death of Banda, the Khalsa Fauj divided into various jathas (armed group or band of Sikhs). Since the Sikh community had dispersed to the jungles, deserts, and mountains to avoid state persecution, the focus of the Khalsa Fauj turned to plunder for the time being. There was no clear leader during this period. Small groups of bands of Sikh horsemen still carried out guerilla ambushes on the enemy when the opportunity arose. The period between the death of Banda and the hegemony of the Sikh Confederacy is one of the darkest annals in Sikh history, with the Khalsa Fauj fighting for the very survival of the Sikh community faced with certain elimination by genocide perpetrated by emperor Farrukhsiyar. By the 1720s, the rebellion of the Sikhs had been extinguished. During this time, Abdus Saman Khan, a Turani official and commander of the Mughal military stationed in Punjab, had a very harsh policy against the Sikhs. Any Sikh which was found was given the choice of conversion to Islam or death. When Zakaria Khan, son of Abdus Saman Khan, became the subahdar (governor) of Lahore subah (province) in 1726, he wanted the Sikhs to join the Mughal cause against the Afghan invaders or at the very least remain neutral but things did not work out that way.

Army details

Tactics 
Significance was heavily placed on cavalry and hand-to-hand combat on horseback. The Khalsa Fauj used guerilla warfare tactics.

Equipment 
Horses for the army were sourced from small zamindars (landowners) located between the Ravi and Beas rivers. Some warriors possessed matchlock guns whilst others still used bows-and-arrows.

Organization 
Various village chieftains made-up the ranks of the Khalsa Fauj under Guru Gobind Singh. Some chiefs had a larger group of warriors under them (up to hundreds) whilst others only had a few. The base-of-operations for these chiefs was usually their native village, which were often fortified.

Pay 
There was no regular salary for soldiers in the Khalsa Fauj during the period of Guru Gobind Singh. Rather, they had the chance to plunder their enemies' estates under a religious cause.

Symbols

Coiled snake 
Guru Gobind Singh compared the Khalsa Fauj to a coiled snake ready to pounce, which he calls the pechida maar, in his Zafarnama (epistle of victory) letter addressed to Aurangzeb:

Colour 
The uniform and colours of the Khalsa Fauj were blue due to Guru Gobind Singh witnessing his youngest son, Fateh Singh, donning such garbs in this colour. Thereafter he standardized them in his army.

Successor 
It was succeeded by the Dal Khalsa of the Sikh Confederacy, established by Nawab Kapur Singh in the 1730s. The Sarbat Khalsa united the various jathas of the Khalsa Fauj into more organized and streamlined formations. This reform would lead to the Sikh Confederacy, ruled by various misls.

Legacy 
Sikh armies in later periods up till the present are sometimes called "Khalsa Fauj", including the military forces of the Sikh Empire, the Sikh Khalsa Army. During the 2020–2021 Indian farmers' protest, songs were made that compared the victorious protesting farmers to the Khalsa Fauj of Guru Gobind Singh.

Timeline 

 1699 – Founding of the Khalsa Panth, the functionalities and institution of the Akal Sena is absorbed into the Khalsa Fauj
 1700 – Battle of Anandpur (1700)
 1701 – Battle of Anandpur (1701)
 1702 – Battle of Basoli
 1702 – Battle of Nirmohgarh
 1702 – First Battle of Chamkaur
 1704 – First Battle of Anandpur (1704)
 May to December 1704 or 1705 – Second Battle of Anandpur (1704)
 December 1704 or 1705 – Battle of Sarsa
 December 1704 or 1705 – Second Battle of Chamkaur
 29 December 1705 – Battle of Muktsar
 20 June 1707 – Battle of Jajau
 5 October 1708 – Banda Singh Bahadur is promoted to general of the Khalsa Fauj by Guru Gobind Singh and sent on a mission to conquer Punjab
 7 October 1708 – passing of Guru Gobind Singh due to partially healed wounds, from an injury sustained in a previous assassination attempt, opening up
 1709 – Battle of Sonipat
 26 November 1709 – Battle of Samana
 12 May 1710 – Battle of Chappar Chiri
 1710 – Siege of Sirhind
 1710 – Battle of Sadhaura
 11 October 1710 – Battle of Rahon
 1710 – Battle of Lohgarh
 1710 – Battle of Jalalabad
 13 November 1710 – Battle of Thanesar
 1712 – Battle of Jammu
 1716 – Battle of Gurdas Nangal
 1716 – Siege of Gurdaspur, fall of the first Sikh state and capture of Banda Singh and his followers by the Mughal forces
 June 1716 – Banda and 2,000 of his followers are brutally executed publicly in Delhi by the Mughals
 1716 – 1726 – Abdus Saman Khan viciously persecutes Sikhs, trying to wipe them out entirely. Khalsa Fauj evacuates the community to remote areas and initiates a guerilla warfare against the Mughal authority
 1726 – Zakaria Khan becomes the new governor of Lahore province. He attempts to neuter the Sikh aggression towards the Mughals or get them to join the Mughal camp against the Afghans but fails in either objective
 1726 – Battle of Wan
 1730's – succeeded by the Dal Khalsa of the Sikh Confederacy

References 

Sikh warriors
Sikhs
Battles involving the Sikhs
Wars involving the states and peoples of Asia